Earth and Beyond is a Doctor Who audio production produced by the BBC featuring the Eighth Doctor and Sam Jones.  The release contains three adventures that are read by Paul McGann. It was released onto cassette in September 1998, following the BBC Short Trips cassette from earlier that year.

Bounty

Synopsis
Sam Jones's first trip in the TARDIS is to the Seychelles, where she encounters  alien bounty hunters.  Can the Doctor stop them making Earth their battleground?

Continuity
This follows the novel The Eight Doctors.
At the end of the story, the Doctor leaves Sam at a rally. He picks her up in Vampire Science.

Dead Time

Synopsis
The TARDIS lands on a freezing world of utter darkness. Who are the strange creatures that want the Doctor dead? And what consequences will their actions have for the universe?

Continuity
Comments by Sam suggest that this follows the events of Genocide.

In print
This was previously released in the short story collection More Short Trips.

The People's Temple

Synopsis
The Doctor and Sam arrive at Stonehenge during its construction. They soon discover that its origins are steeped in human suffering. But could Sam's attempts to make things better for the slave workers trying to complete the stone circle lead to a war?

In print
This was previously released in the short story collection Short Trips.

Eighth Doctor audio plays